On the Line is a 2001 American romantic comedy film starring Lance Bass, Joey Fatone and Emmanuelle Chriqui. The film was directed by Eric Bross and was written by Eric Aronson and Paul Stanton, based upon their short film of the same name.

Plot
Kevin is performing with his band at a high school graduation party. When he sees an attractive girl, his bandmates try to get him to sing to her and ask her out. He becomes nervous, and envisions himself nude in front of everyone, and faints. Seven years later, Kevin is working in advertising. He makes a pitch for Reebok that is rejected, though the pitch is later used in the meeting by his "partner" Jackie, who presents it as hers. As he takes the train home from work, Kevin meets Abbey, with whom he finds he has much in common, such as their mutual interest in the Chicago Cubs and Al Green.

Kevin tries to find Abbey by making posters imploring Abbey to contact him, and placing them all over town. He goes out with a few random women who respond, none of whom are Abbey. The local newspaper finds out about his search and sets up an interview. The reporter, Brady Frances (Dan Montgomery, Jr.), is an old classmate who harbors ill will toward Kevin, on account of a girl in high school who rejected Brady for Kevin. When Brady's article is published, Kevin gets hundreds of calls, which leads to his dateless roommates — aspiring musician Rod, slacker Eric, and art aficionado Randy — suggesting they date all the callers to help. Kevin rejects this idea, but a miscommunication leads Eric to believe that Kevin has approved it. A follow up article is published in which Brady portrays Kevin as a failure, which garners even more calls from women. Brady is further irritated when his girlfriend Julie, who is bothered by his grudge against Kevin, takes Kevin's side.

Meanwhile, Abbey is having problems with her boyfriend of three years, whom she was visiting when she met Kevin. Her boyfriend buys tickets to an Al Green concert, but then cancels at the last minute. Kevin is also at the concert, but they never see each other, despite several close calls. As Kevin's roommates date the women who responded to the articles in order to find Abbey, they encounter Julie. When she tells Brady that Kevin's friends are answering the calls and dating the respondents, Brady reports this as a scam in a follow-up article. As a result, Reebok declines to work with Kevin, and he is taken off the project. When Kevin subsequently sees Abbey waiting for a train, he tries to get her attention but she only sees him after she boards the train, and the doors close before he can get to her. Kevin also learns that Abbey responded to his public search for her, and when he learns that Eric went out on a date with her, he punches Eric.

After Kevin's best friend at the agency, Nathan, suffers a heart attack, Kevin visits him at a rehab facility, where Nathan tells him the story of both meeting his wife at a Chicago Cubs game, and catching a home run from Cubs legend Ernie Banks the same day, and how the two events are tied together. He gives Kevin the baseball and tells him to try to find Abbey again.

Jackie apologizes to Kevin, and places him in charge of the campaign's billboards. He uses the billboards to publicly ask Abbey to meet him at the train station at a specific day and time, which garners the interest of the media, who wait with him at the scheduled time. Kevin and Abbey are reunited at the station, much to the delight of the crowd at the station, to the television viewers at home, and to his roommates watching this unfold in a bar. In addition, Randy meets a woman who enjoys art as he does, Julie dumps Brady for Rod, who is offered a recording contract by a record label after rock star Mick Silver listens to a demo tape of his that Kevin sent, and Brady is given an advice column in the Living section of the Chicago Times.

Cast
 Lance Bass as Kevin Gibbons
 Emmanuelle Chriqui as Abbey
 Joey Fatone as Rod
 GQ as Eric
 James Bulliard as Randy
 Jerry Stiller as Nathan
 Richie Sambora as Mick Silver
 Dave Foley as Higgins
 Tamala Jones as Jackie
 Amanda Foreman as Julie
 Chyna as Rod's date
 Justin Timberlake (uncredited) as Make-up artist
 Chris Kirkpatrick (uncredited) as Angelo the hairstylist

Cameos as themselves
 Al Green
 Ananda Lewis
 Sammy Sosa
 Damon Buford
 Eric Young
 Brandi Williams (from Blaque)

Production
According to a DVD release, the film was shot in Toronto, Ontario, Canada and Chicago, Illinois.

The original screenplay for the film would have received an R rating, but was rewritten to a PG so that it could be marketed to NSYNC fans.

The short film on which the film was based starred Troy Garity, Charlie O'Connell, and Eric Michael Cole.

During the film's closing credits, NSYNC members Justin Timberlake and Chris Kirkpatrick appear as comical hair and makeup artists in mock "behind the scenes" footage, doing hair and makeup for Bass, Fatone and Chriqui. JC Chasez is the only NSYNC member who does not appear in the film.

Soundtrack

Reception
The film was produced on a US$16 million budget. Miramax marketed the film heavily towards *NSYNC's teen fans, and the film's soundtrack featured songs by teen pop artists Mandy Moore and BB Mak, along with previously unreleased tracks by *NSYNC and Britney Spears. However, the film was a box-office flop, and grossed only $4.3 million domestically.

The film was heavily criticized, especially by Roger Ebert, who said the film was "...an agonizingly creaky movie that laboriously plods through a plot so contrived that the only thing real about it is its length."

On Rotten Tomatoes, the film has a 19% approval rating of 19% based on 70 reviews, with an average rating of 3.7/10. The site's consensus states: "An inept attempt at a romantic comedy aimed at 'NSYNC fans."

References

External links
 
 
 
 

2001 romantic comedy films
2001 films
American romantic comedy films
Miramax films
Films directed by Eric Bross
Films set in Chicago
Films shot in Chicago
Films shot in Toronto
Features based on short films
NSYNC
Films scored by Stewart Copeland
2000s English-language films
2000s American films